"Unbearably White" is a song by American indie pop band Vampire Weekend. It was released on April 4, 2019 by Columbia Records as a double A-side with "This Life", and the third single from their album Father of the Bride.

Background
Discussing the track with The Sunday Times before its release, Koenig commented that "infighting among white people about who is marginally more or less white is not particularly interesting", and that the song partially explores that. The phrase "unbearably white" had previously been used as a criticism of the band, in reference to their race.

Composition
The art pop song develops and shifts between isolated vocals, handbells, jazz fusion-inspired bass guitar, and orchestral swells, and lyrically explores a failing relationship. The track's title has been described as a "prank", as the song does not discuss Koenig's racial identity.

Critical reception
For Pitchfork, Sheldon Pearce described the song as "gorgeous", concluding that "as the [song's] characters seek salvation from a bitter coldness, Vampire Weekend find a spark".

Personnel
Credits adapted from Father of the Bride's liner notes.

 Ariel Rechtshaid – engineering, mixing
 Chris Kasych – engineering
 John DeBold – engineering
 Hiroya Takayama – engineering
 Takemasa Kosaka – engineering
 Emily Lazar – mastering
 Chris Allgood – mastering assistance

Charts

References

2019 songs
2019 singles
Vampire Weekend songs
Art pop songs
Songs written by Ezra Koenig
Song recordings produced by Ariel Rechtshaid
Song recordings produced by BloodPop
Columbia Records singles